The Dominican Summer League Rays or DSL Rays are a Rookie League affiliate of the Tampa Bay Rays based in the Dominican Republic. They play in the Dominican Summer League. As an independent affiliate, they have been in existence since 1997.

History
The team first came into existence in 1996, two years before the MLB debut of the Tampa Bay Devil Rays. They shared an affiliation with the then-California Angels and were known as the DSL Devil Rays/Angels.

From 1997 to 2001, the team was known as the DSL Devil Rays. They ceased operations from 2002 to 2006, before returning in 2007. In 2008, the team changed its name to the DSL Rays to correspond with the name change of the parent club.

Rosters

References

Baseball teams established in 1997
Tampa Bay Rays minor league affiliates
Dominican Summer League teams
Baseball teams in the Dominican Republic
1997 establishments in the Dominican Republic